Paul Anthony Midgley (born 1966) FRS is a Professor of Materials Science in the Department of Materials Science and Metallurgy at the University of Cambridge and a fellow of Peterhouse, Cambridge.

Education
Midgley was educated at the University of Bristol where he was awarded a Master of Science degree in 1988 and a PhD in 1991 for work on electron microscopy of high-temperature superconductors.

Career
Before moving to Cambridge in 1997, Midgley held two postdoctoral research fellowships in the Henry Herbert Wills Physics Laboratory at the University of Bristol.

Research
Midgley's research interests are in electron tomography, electron holography, energy-filtered imaging and ab initio structure determination by electron diffraction. During his research, Midgley has collaborated with Mark Welland, Rafal Dunin-Borkowski, Neil Mathur, John Meurig Thomas, Brian F. G. Johnson and Henning Sirringhaus.

Midgley's research has been funded by the Engineering and Physical Sciences Research Council (EPSRC), the Royal Commission for the Exhibition of 1851 and the Royal Society.

Awards and honours
Midgley was elected a Fellow of the Royal Society (FRS) in 2014. His nomination reads:

References

Living people
Fellows of the Royal Society
Alumni of the University of Bristol
Academics of the University of Cambridge
British materials scientists
Fellows of Peterhouse, Cambridge
1966 births